Grazia Pierantoni-Mancini (born 1841–1843; died 1915) was an Italian writer and the wife of Augusto Pierantoni.

References 

19th-century Italian women writers
19th-century Italian writers
Italian-language poets
Italian women dramatists and playwrights
Italian women poets
Italian women short story writers
1915 deaths
1841 births